UCF most commonly stands for the University of Central Florida, a metropolitan public research university located in Orlando, Florida, United States. 

It may also refer to:

 UCF Knights, the athletic program of the University of Central Florida
 United Civil Front, a social movement in Russia founded and led by chess grandmaster Garry Kasparov
 Universal conductance fluctuations, a phenomenon encountered in quantum physics in electrical transport experiments in mesoscopic species
 Universal Communication Format, a communication protocol developed by the IEEE for multimedia communication
 United Citizen Federation, a fictional world government of Earth in the 1997 film Starship Troopers
 Ulster Cycling Federation, a member of Cycling Ireland
 ucf (Update Configuration File), a Unix utility for preserving user changes to configuration files

See also